David Muntaner Juaneda (born 12 July 1983) is a Spanish track cyclist. At the 2008 and 2012 Summer Olympics, he competed in the Men's team pursuit for the national team.

Muntaner turned professional for the 2014 road season with the ActiveJet team.

References

External links
 
 
 
 

Spanish male cyclists
Living people
Olympic cyclists of Spain
Cyclists at the 2008 Summer Olympics
Cyclists at the 2012 Summer Olympics
1983 births
Sportspeople from Palma de Mallorca
UCI Track Cycling World Champions (men)
Spanish track cyclists
Cyclists from the Balearic Islands